In particle physics, the phi meson or  meson is a vector meson formed of a strange quark and a strange antiquark. It was the  meson's unusual propensity to decay into  and  that led to the discovery of the OZI rule.

Properties
In all cases, it decays via the strong force. The pion channel would naïvely be the dominant decay channel because the collective mass of the pions is smaller than that of the kaons, making it energetically favorable; however, it is suppressed by the OZI rule.

This can be shown by deconstructing the wave function of the  into its component parts.
 ,
 ,

where
  is the nonet mixing angle,
  and
 .

The mixing angle at which the components decouple completely can be calculated to be . Therefore, the  meson is nearly a pure  state.

History
It was discovered later in 1962 by P.L. Connolly, et al. in a 20-inch hydrogen bubble chamber at the Alternating Gradient Synchrotron (AGS) in Brookhaven National Laboratory in Uptown, NY while they were studying  collisions at approximately 2.23GeV/c. In essence, the reaction involved a beam of s being accelerated to high energies to collide with protons.

The  meson has several possible decay modes. The most energetically favored mode involves the  meson decaying into 3 pions, which is what would naïvely be expected. However, we instead observe that it decays most frequently into 2 kaons. Between 1963 and 1966, 3 people, Susumu Okubo, George Zweig and Jugoro Iizuka, each independently proposed a rule to account for the observed suppression of the 3 pion decay. Namely, on average they last  and  respectively.

In 1999, a  factory named DAFNE (or DANE since the F stands for " Factory") began operation to study the decay of the  meson in Frascati, Italy. It produces  mesons via electron-positron collisions. It has numerous detectors, including the KLOE detector which was in operation at the beginning of its operation.

See also
Charmonium
List of mesons
List of particles
Quark model

References

Mesons
Onia
Strange quark
Subatomic particles with spin 1